The Nuu-chah-nulth, also formerly referred to as the Nootka, Nutka, Aht, Nuuchahnulth or Tahkaht, are one of the Indigenous peoples of the Pacific Northwest Coast in Canada. The term Nuu-chah-nulth is used to describe fifteen related tribes whose traditional home is on the west coast of Vancouver Island.

In precontact and early post-contact times, the number of tribes was much greater, but the smallpox epidemics and other consequences of settler colonization resulted in the disappearance of some groups and the absorption of others into neighbouring groups. The Nuu-chah-nulth are related to the Kwakwaka'wakw, the Haisla, and the Ditidaht First Nation. The Nuu-chah-nulth language belongs to the Wakashan family.

The governing body is the Nuu-chah-nulth Tribal Council.

History

Contact with Europeans
When James Cook first encountered the villagers at Yuquot in 1778, they directed him to "come around" (Nuu-chah-nulth nuutkaa is "to circle around") with his ship to the harbour. Cook interpreted this as the First Nation's name for the inlet, now called Nootka Sound. The term was also applied to the indigenous inhabitants of the area.

The Nuu-chah-nulth were among the first Pacific peoples north of California to encounter Europeans, who sailed into their area for trade, particularly the Maritime fur trade. Tensions flared up between Spain and Great Britain over control of Nootka Sound, which led to a bitter international dispute around 1790 known as the Nootka Crisis. It was settled under the Nootka Convention, in which Spain agreed to abandon its exclusive claims to the North Pacific coast. Negotiations to settle the dispute were handled under the aegis and hospitality of Maquinna, a powerful chief of the Mowachaht Nuu-chah-nulth.

A few years later, Maquinna and his warriors captured the American trading ship Boston in March 1803. He and his men killed the captain and all the crew but two, whom they kept as slaves. After gaining release, John R. Jewitt wrote a classic captivity narrative about his nearly 3 years with the Nuu-chah-nulth and his reluctant assimilation to their society. This 1815 book is titled Narrative of the Adventures and Sufferings of John R. Jewitt;, Only Survivor of the Crew of the Ship Boston, during a Captivity of Nearly Three Years among the Savages of Nootka Sound: With an Account of the Manners, Mode of Living, and Religious Opinions of the Natives. In the end, Jewitt escaped with the help of Wickaninnish, a chief from an opposing group.

In 1811 the trading ship Tonquin was blown up in Clayoquot Sound. Tla-o-qui-aht warriors had attacked the ship in revenge for an insult by the ship's captain. The captain and almost all the crew were killed and the ship abandoned. The next day warriors reboarded the empty ship to salvage it. However, a hiding crew member set fire to the ship's magazine and the resulting explosion killed many First Nation peoples. Only one crew member, a pilot / interpreter hired from the nearby Quinault nation, escaped to tell the tale.

From earliest contact with European and American explorers up until 1830, more than 90% of the Nuu-chah-nulth died as a result of infectious disease epidemics, particularly malaria and smallpox. Europeans and Americans were immune to these endemic diseases but the First Nations had no immunity to them (see Native American disease and epidemics). The high rate of deaths added to the social disruption and cultural turmoil resulting from contact with Westerners. In the early 20th century, the population was estimated at 3,500.

20th century
In 1979, the tribes of western Vancouver Island chose the term Nuu-chah-nulth (nuučaan̓uł, meaning "all along the mountains and sea"), as a collective term of identification. This was the culmination of the 1958 alliance forged among these tribes in order to present a unified political voice to the levels of government and European-Canadian society. In 1985, the Government of British Columbia signed an agreement to delegate authority for the delivery of Child Welfare Services to the Nuu-Chah-Nulth, making the Nuu-Chah-Nulth the first delegated aboriginal agency in British Columbia. The Makah of northwest Washington, located on the Olympic Peninsula in their own reservation, are closely related to the Nuu-chah-nulth.

Tribes

In the 20th century, recognised Nuu-chah-nulth band governments are:
Ahousaht First Nation: (population over 2,000) formed from the merger of the Ahousaht and Kelthsmaht, Manhousaht, Qwatswiaht and Bear River bands in 1951;
Ehattesaht First Nation; (population 294)
Hesquiaht First Nation; (population 653)
Kyuquot/Cheklesahht First Nation; (population 486)
Mowachaht/Muchalaht First Nations: (population 520) formerly the Nootka band;
Nuchatlaht First Nation; (population 165)
Huu-ay-aht First Nation: (formerly Ohiaht); (population 598)
Hupacasath First Nation (formerly Opetchesaht); (256)
Tla-o-qui-aht First Nations: (formerly Clayoquot); (population 881)
Toquaht First Nation; (population 117)
Tseshaht First Nation; (population 1002)
Uchucklesaht First Nation; (population 181)
Yuułuʔiłʔatḥ (Ucluelet First Nation); (population 606)

Total population for the 13 tribes in the Nuuchahnulth nation is 8,147, according to the Nuuchahnulth Tribal Council Indian Registry of February 2006.

The Ditidaht First Nation (population 690), while politically and culturally affiliated with the Nuu-chah-nulth, are independently referred to. In addition, the Pacheedaht First Nation are not politically affiliated with the Nuu-chah-nulth Tribal Council.

Culture

Whaling

The Nuu-chah-nulth were one of the few Indigenous peoples on the Pacific Coast who hunted whales. Whaling is essential to Nuu-chah-nulth culture and spirituality. It is reflected in stories, songs, names, family lines, and numerous place names throughout their territories.

Carbon dating shows that the Nuu-chah-nulth peoples hunted whales over 4000 years ago for both blubber and meat. The Nuu-chah-nulth peoples hunted whales of different species due to the range of territory that they reside in and the migration pattern of the whales. Those most often caught would be either grey or humpback whales due to their more docile nature and how close they would come to the shore.

There is evidence that occasionally members of the Nuu-chah-nulth nations would hunt an orca despite the danger and difficulty as a way of showing bravery. Although it was a hazardous undertaking, those that ate “killer whale” regarded both its meat and blubber to be of higher quality than that of the larger whales.

While whaling provided the Nuu-chah-nulth nations with an important source of food and blubber - which could be rendered into oil - it also played an important role in social life as well. The chief would lead a whale hunting party that was made up of other prominent members of the community. The traditional whaling practices of the fourteen different Nuu-chah-nulth nations vary as each community has their own distinct traditions, ceremonies, and rituals. Some simplified examples of Nuu-chah-nulth whaling traditions include ceremonial bathing, abstinence, prayer, and ceremony which were to be performed before and after the hunt. These rituals were performed by the chief leading the hunt as well as his wife; the ceremonies were seen as a key factor in determining the outcome of the hunt. Social status didn't just affect who was allowed to join the whaling hunt, it also affected the distribution of the whales’ meat and the blubber.

Perhaps the most famous Nuu-chah-nulth artifact in modern years is the Yuquot Whalers' Shrine, a ritual house-like structure used in the spiritual preparations for whale hunts. Composed of a series of memorial posts depicting spirit figures and the bones of whaling ancestors, it is stored at the American Museum of Natural History in New York City, having been taken there by European Americans. It was the subject of the film The Washing of Tears, directed by Hugh Brody. It recounts the rediscovery of the bones and other artifacts at the museum and the efforts by the Mowachaht First Nation, the shrine's original owners, who have been seeking to regain these sacred artifacts.

Food
While the Nuu-chah-nulth nations did rely on whaling as an important food and oil resource, the territories they lived had many other food sources including the bounty of food to be found in both the ocean and on the land.

The Nuu-chah-nulth peoples gathered food from marine environments including fish species such as halibut, herring, rockfish, and salmon which were caught along the coast while along the shoreline other sea inhabitant like clams, sea urchins, and mussels were harvested at low tide. Salmon streams were tended to ensure their continued strength and the fish were either cooked in large wooden vessels using water and hot stones or dried to be consumed during the winter.

Nuu-chah-nulth nations also gathered resources from the land as food sources. Some of these edible plants include camas root, rhizomes from ferns and many different variety of berries such as blueberry and huckleberry to name a few examples. Some of the Nuu-chah-nulth nations also tended the growth of camas root and Crabapple trees in order to maintain them as a source of food.

Within Nuu-chah-nulth nations individuals passed down their extensive knowledge of when and where to find these marine and land based foods through the generations from elders to youth. This is done both through comprehensive oral histories and through actively teaching children these important skills and having them participate in the collection of resources at a young age.

In an effort to revive traditional diets, the Nuu-chah-nulth Tribal Council and sixteen tribes have contributed to recipes in a traditional wild food cookbook. The 90-page cookbook focuses on traditional recipes and seasonal ingredients from the west coast of Vancouver Island and Northern Washington. It explores First Nations cuisine and adds cooking tips, cultural observations, and oral history anecdotes. Čamus (chum-us) features traditional and wild ingredients.

Čamus explores the art of how to butterfly a salmon and how to can fish, also providing recipes for marinated seaweed, steam pit cooking, and Nuu-chah-nulth upskwee. Čamus illuminates a traditional way of eating while promoting a healthy lifestyle. The First Nations of Vancouver Island's west coast and northern Washington link family and community in their respectful treatment of their territories' freshest ingredients.

Cedar tree use
Nuu-chah-nulth nations also used the wood and bark of red and yellow cedar trees as both a building material and to produce many different objects. Artists and wood workers within a nation would carve full logs into totem poles and ocean going canoes, and the bark would be torn into strips and softened in water until malleable enough to be woven into baskets, clothing, and ceremonial regalia.

Social hierarchy
Due to the abundance of resources throughout the territories of the Nuu-chah-nulth nations, social life became more structured and a visible hierarchy formed within the communities. These consisted of the commoner class, and the chiefs that controlled the region. While members of the commoner class had autonomy they still required the consent of the chief to fish, hunt, and forage within the communities’ territory.

While being in control of ceremonial and territorial rights, chiefs were also responsible for the redistribution of wealth within their communities. This redistribution of wealth was a key societal factor for the Nuu-chah-nulth nations. A chief's status is realized and maintained by their ability to provide for the members of their nation. By dictating the use of resources, chiefs could maintain social structure, and ensure the continued viability and strength of those resources.

Potlatch

The Nuu-chah-nulth and other Pacific Northwest cultures are famous for their potlatch ceremonies, in which the host honours guests with generous gifts. The term 'potlatch' is ultimately a word of Nuu-chah-nulth origin. The purpose of the potlatch is manifold: redistribution of wealth, maintenance and recognition of social status, cementing alliances, the celebration and solemnization of marriage, and commemoration of important events.

Notable people 

 Samuel Haiyupis, carver
 George Clutesi, artist, actor, writer

See also
 Uu-a-thluk, aquatic management organization

Notes

References
 Ellis, David, W.; & Swan, Luke. (1981). Teachings of the Tides: Uses of Marine Invertebrates by the Manhousat People. Nanaimo, British Columbia: Theytus Books.
 Hoover, Alan L. (Ed.). (2002). Nuu-Chah-Nulth Voices: Histories, Objects & Journeys. Victoria, B. C.: Royal British Columbia Museum.
 Kim, Eun-Sook. (2003). Theoretical Issues in Nuu-Chah-Nulth Phonology and Morphology. (Doctoral Dissertation, University Of British Columbia, Department Of Linguistics).
 McMillian, Alan D. (1999). Since the Time of the Transformers: The Ancient Heritage of Nuu-Chah-Nulth, Ditidaht, and Makah. Vancouver: UBC Press.
 
 Sapir, Edward; & Swadesh, Morris. (1939). Nootka Texts: Tales and Ethnological Narratives with Grammatical Notes and Lexical Materials. Philadelphia: Linguistic Society Of America.
 Sapir, Edward; & Swadesh, Morris. (1955). Native Accounts of Nootka Ethnography. Publication of the Indiana University Research Center in Anthropology, Folklore, and Linguistics (No. 1); International Journal of American Linguistics (Vol. 21, No. 4, Pt. 2). Bloomington: Indiana University Research Center in Anthropology, Folklore, and Linguistics. (Reprinted 1978 In New York: AMS Press).
 Shank, Scott; & Wilson, Ian. (2000). "Acoustic Evidence for  As a Glottalized Pharyngeal Glide in Nuu-Chah-Nulth." In S. Gessner & S. Oh (Eds.), Proceedings of the 35th International Conference on Salish and Neighboring Languages (pp. 185–197). UBC Working Papers in Linguistics (Vol. 3).

External links

 Nuu-chah-nulth Home Page
 An extract, Nuuchahnulth Dictionary''
 Nootka Texts
 What Mosquitos are made of
 Kwatyat and Wolf
 Kwatyat and Sunbeam's Daughter
 Bibliography of Materials on the Nuuchanulth Language (YDLI)
 Nuuchahnulth (Nootka) (Chris Harvey's Native Language Font, & Keyboard)
 Nuuchahnulth Example Text
 map of Northwest Coast First Nations (including Nuu-chah-nulth)
 The Wakashan Linguistics Page
 The Washing of Tears, Internet Movie Database

 
 
Canadian slave owners